XEMMM-AM is a radio station in Mexicali, Baja California, broadcasting on 940 kHz.

History
XEWV-AM received its concession in March 1955. In 1974, Cadena Baja California bought XEWV-AM.

The callsign was changed to XEMMM-AM in 2003 after the Tijuana station that held those calls became XESPN-AM. Not long after, CBC sold XEMMM to Organización Editorial Mexicana, which had also bought 820 AM at the same time.

References

Spanish-language radio stations
Radio stations in Mexicali